Argyrotaenia rufescens is a species of moth of the family Tortricidae. It is found in Morona-Santiago Province, Ecuador.

The wingspan is 14–16 mm. The ground colour of the forewings is brownish with diffuse refractive dots and rust brown markings. The hindwings are grey-brown.

Etymology
The species name refers to the colour of the forewings and is derived from Latin rufescens  (meaning becoming rust).

References

Moths described in 2009
rufescens
Moths of South America